Viktor Ivanovich Lyadov (born 18 February 1966) is a Russian pianist.

Still a student at the Moscow Conservatory, he won prizes at Zwickau's Robert Schumann and Paloma O'Shea Santander International Piano competitions. In 1994 he won the Hamamatsu International Piano Competition. A 6th prize at the 1995 Queen Elisabeth closes his competition record.

References 

Russian classical pianists
Male classical pianists
1966 births
Living people
21st-century classical pianists
21st-century Russian male musicians